The 1870 Tipperary by-election was fought on 28 February 1870.  The by-election was fought due to the disqualification (convicted felon) of the incumbent Independent Nationalist MP, Jeremiah O'Donovan Rossa.  It was won by the Liberal candidate Denis Caulfield Heron.

References

1870 elections in the United Kingdom
By-elections to the Parliament of the United Kingdom in County Tipperary constituencies
1870 elections in Ireland